Ahigal can refer to:

 Ahigal, a municipality in Cáceres province, Extremadura, Spain
 Ahigal de Villarino, a municipality in Salamanca province, Castilla y León, Spain
 Ahigal de los Aceiteros, a municipality Salamanca province, Castilla y León, Spain